Mount Nathan is a rural locality in the City of Gold Coast, Queensland, Australia.

Geography
Mount Nathan is situated in the Gold Coast hinterland in South East Queensland.

Mount Nathan Road / Beaudesert-Nerang Road (State Route 90) runs along the eastern boundary, and then passes through from north-east to west. Nerang–Murwillumbah Road (State Route 97) runs along a part of the south-eastern boundary.

History 
Silkwood Steiner School opened in 1997.

The median age of the Mount Nathan population was 41 years, 3 years above the national median of 38, with 76.1% of people having been born in Australia. The other top responses for country of birth were England 6.5%, New Zealand 5.0%, South Africa 0.9%, USA 0.8% and Sri Lanka 0.7%. 91.6% of people spoke only English at home; the next most common languages were Mandarin (0.5%), Japanese (0.4%), German and French (0.3%).

Education 
Silkwood Steiner School is a private primary and secondary (Prep-12) school for boys and girls at 27 & 39 Shepherd Hill Lane. In 2017, the school had an enrolment of 575 students with 44 teachers (41 full-time equivalent) and 39 non-teaching staff (32 full-time equivalent).

References

External links

  — includes Mount Nathan

Suburbs of the Gold Coast, Queensland
Localities in Queensland